Coleophora haoma is a moth of the family Coleophoridae. It is found on the Canary Islands (Fuerteventura) and in Iran and Spain.

References

haoma
Moths described in 1994
Moths of Europe
Moths of Asia
Moths of Africa